Bogotá F.C. is a Colombian professional football team based in Bogotá, that currently plays in the Categoría Primera B. They play their home games at the Estadio Metropolitano de Techo.

History
Bogotá F.C. is a club with a duality in its history, having been born under its current name in 2004 when it debuted in the Colombian second division, but coming from another club named Club El Cóndor which was founded in 1991 and played under three different guises: in 2000 the club was called El Cóndor, in 2002 Cóndor Real Bogotá and a few years later Cóndor Deportivo Sur-Bogotá.

Bogotá's best performance was achieved in the first half of 2007 in the Copa Premier, after qualifying to a semifinal phase for the first time ever, with a near-perfect season and a roster mixing experienced players and young talents such as Javier Cuero.

In 2005, the team's management was taken over by the company "GoGo" which provided capital to the team. During the 2010 season, played in one tournament, Bogotá performed a great campaign, advancing to the semi-finals in sixth place. After leading their group in the first half of that stage with seven points out of nine, they were eliminated after losing 3–2 at home against Deportivo Pasto and drawing 1–1 with Patriotas, also at home.

In March 2012 it was announced that due to lack of support in Bogotá, the club would be leaving for the city of Montería in the department of Córdoba for the 2013 season. DIMAYOR granted this request on March 27, but negotiations ultimately fell through and Bogotá decided to stay at the Colombian capital.

Stadium

Current squad

References

External links

Official website
Dimayor page

Football clubs in Colombia
Association football clubs established in 2003
2003 establishments in Colombia
Categoría Primera B clubs